Hualca Hualca (possibly from Aymara and Quechua wallqa collar) is an extinct volcano in Arequipa Region in the Andes of Peru. It is located at the Peruvian province of Caylloma.

Geography and geomorphology 

Hualca Hualca is part of the Central Volcanic Zone of the Andes, a volcanic belt which occurs where the Nazca Plate subducts beneath the South America Plate. Volcanoes in Peru that are part of the Central Volcanic Zone include Ampato, Casiri, Chachani, Coropuna, El Misti, Huaynaputina, Pichu Pichu, Sabancaya, Sara Sara, Solimana, Ticsani, Tutupaca, Ubinas and Yucamane.

Hualca Hualca forms a volcanic complex with the two southerly volcanoes Sabancaya and Ampato. It is older (Pliocene-Pleistocene) and more heavily eroded than these two volcanoes; they are all constructed on Neogene ignimbrites, one of which was dated to 2.2 ± 1.5 million years ago. Volcanic rocks of Hualca Hualca contain phenocrysts of biotite, clinopyroxene, hornblende, orthopyroxene, plagioclase and sphene. The magma probably originated through mixing processes, similar to Sabancaya.

Sector collapse 

The northern flank of Hualca Hualca underwent a large sector collapse between 1.36 and 0.61 million years ago, opening up a collapse amphitheatre and forming a lake in the Colca valley which later catastrophically failed. This lake has left lacustrine deposits in the Colca Valley. Eruptions within the collapse amphitheatre generated lava flows which then formed volcanic dams in the Colca Valley. Lava domes and pyroclastic flows also originated within the collapse scar. Earthquakes and hydrothermal alteration probably caused the onset of the collapse event.

Glaciation 

The volcano was glaciated during the last ice age, between 18,000 and 11,500 years ago. This glaciation has left moraines, rock glaciers and roches moutonees. The glaciers on Hualca Hualca have retreated since then, one was reported to have disappeared by 2000. Snowmelt and runoff from Hualca Hualca are sources of water for the Colca Canyon, supporting irrigated agriculture there; the mountain is worshipped by local inhabitants, who according to reports in 1586 believed that their ancestors come from it.

Recent activity 

Hualca Hualca is considered to be an extinct volcano; however at least seven vents on its southwestern flank show evidence of Holocene activity. This deformation may be associated with the neighbouring volcano Sabancaya which is active; magma chambers of volcanoes are sometimes distant from the actual volcano as was the case with Katmai. The inflation ceased after 1997. At Pinchollo in the collapse scar three geysers were active in the past; one is still active  and is named Infiernillo. The activity of the hydrothermal system at Hualca Hualca increased beginning in 2016, an increase linked to eruptions of Sabancaya and earthquakes.

Climbing and first ascent 
Hualca Hualca can be climbed in a few days from the village of Pinchollo by the north side. It was first climbed by Richard R. Culbert from Canada on 6 April 1966. Evidence of pre-Columbian ascents possibly from Incans, such as coca leaves and a puma skin, was found near the summit. Some reports show Piero Ghiglione and P. Chavez reaching the summit on 23 August 1950, however this was a secondary summit.

See also

 List of mountains in the Andes
 Lake Mucurca

Notes

References 

Volcanoes of Peru
Mountains of Arequipa Region
Andean Volcanic Belt
Mountains of Peru
Six-thousanders of the Andes